Bending the Rules is a 2012 buddy cop action comedy film directed by Artie Mandelberg, produced by WWE Studios, and starring Adam "Edge" Copeland and Jamie Kennedy. The film was released on March 9, 2012 in select theaters in the United States for a limited time.

Plot
Detective Nick Blades (Adam Copeland) is a New Orleans cop on trial for corruption. Assistant District Attorney Theo Gold (Jamie Kennedy) is the man in charge of putting him behind bars. When these two unlikely partners from opposite sides of the law stumble onto a criminal plot, they'll need to rely on luck - and patience - to take down a dangerous killer without killing each other first. Alicia Witt, Jennifer Esposito and Jessica Walter co-star in a story that proves that when the going gets tough, the tough continue to move at a moderate pace, thus proving that slow and steady wins the race.

Cast
 Adam "Edge" Copeland as Nick Blades
 Jamie Kennedy as Theo Gold
 Jessica Walter as Lena Gold
 Alicia Witt as Rosalyn Wohl
 Jennifer Esposito as Officer Olivia Garcia
 Danny Gil as Ed Mackie
 Gary Grubbs as D.A. Clark Gunn
 Philip Baker Hall as Herb Gold
 Pruitt Taylor Vince as Happy
 Kevin Weisman as Gil
 Kirk Bovill as Meter Man
 Elena Lyons as Kelly Gold

Reception

Filming locations
Filming took place in Jefferson Parish, Louisiana and New Orleans, Louisiana.

Soundtrack
• "Going Numb"
Written by Justin La Vallee
Performed by Kahlil Feegel
Courtesy of Shotgun Lullabies

References

External links
 
 

2012 films
American action comedy films
2010s English-language films
Films set in New Orleans
Films shot in New Orleans
WWE Studios films
2010s American films